Niko Jones (born 27 July 2000 in New Zealand) is a New Zealand rugby union player who plays for Auckland in the National Provincial Championship. His playing position is flanker. He was educated at St Peter's College, Auckland,

Reference list

External links
itsrugby.co.uk profile

2000 births
New Zealand rugby union players
New Zealand sportspeople of Samoan descent
Living people
Rugby union flankers
Auckland rugby union players
Moana Pasifika players
People educated at St Peter's College, Auckland